Roberto Molina may refer to:
 Roberto Molina (sailor) (born 1960), Spanish sailor
 Roberto Molina (footballer, born 1971), Argentine footballer
 Roberto Molina (footballer, born 2001), Salvadoran footballer
 Roberto Molina Barreto (born 1955), Guatemalan lawyer and politician